William Franklin  (22 February 1730 – 17 November 1813) was an American-born attorney, soldier, politician, and colonial administrator. He was the acknowledged illegitimate son of Benjamin Franklin. William Franklin was the last colonial Governor of New Jersey (1763–1776), and a steadfast Loyalist throughout the American Revolutionary War. (In contrast, his father Benjamin was, in later life, one of the most prominent of the Patriot leaders of the American Revolution and a Founding Father of the United States.)

Following imprisonment by Patriots in 1776 to 1778, William became the chief leader of the Loyalists. From his base in New York City, he organized military units to fight on the British side. In 1782, he went into exile in Britain. He lived in London until his death.

Early life
William Franklin was born in Philadelphia, Pennsylvania, then a colony in British America. He was the illegitimate son of Benjamin Franklin, a leading figure in the city. His mother's identity is unknown. Confusion exists about Franklin's birth and parentage because Benjamin Franklin was secretive about his son's origins. In 1750, Benjamin Franklin told his mother that William was nineteen years old, but this may have been an attempt to make the youth appear legitimate. Some older reference books give William's birth year as 1731.

William was raised by his father and Deborah Read, his father's common-law wife; she had been abandoned by her legal husband but not divorced. William always called her his mother. There is some speculation that Deborah Read was Franklin's biological mother, and that because of his parents' common-law relationship, the circumstances of his birth were obscured so as not to be politically harmful to him or to their marital arrangement.

Franklin joined a company of Pennsylvania provincial troops in 1746 and spent a winter in Albany in King George's War, obtaining the rank of captain in 1747. As he grew older, he accompanied his father on several missions, including trips to England. Although often depicted as a young child when he assisted his father in the famed kite experiment of 1752, Franklin was at least 21 years old at the time.

Marriage and family
As a young man, William became engaged to Elizabeth Graeme, daughter of prominent Philadelphia physician Dr. Thomas Graeme and step-granddaughter of Pennsylvania's 14th Governor, Sir William Keith. Neither family approved of the match, but when William went to London to study law about 1759, he left with the understanding that Elizabeth would wait for him.

Franklin studied law at the Middle Temple, chiefly under Richard Jackson "The Omniscient".  While in London, Franklin sired an illegitimate son, William Temple Franklin, who was born 22 February 1762. His mother has never been identified, and Temple was placed in foster care.

Later that year, Franklin married Elizabeth Downes on 4 September 1762 at St George's, Hanover Square, in London. She was born in the English colony of Barbados to the sugar planter John Downes and his wife, Elizabeth. She met Franklin while visiting England with her father in 1760. They moved to the New Jersey colony in 1763. Elizabeth died in 1777 while he was imprisoned as a Loyalist during the American Revolutionary War. She was interred beneath the altar of St. Paul's Chapel in lower Manhattan, where she had resided after the British evacuated Perth Amboy. The memorial plaque on the wall at St. Paul's was commissioned by William Franklin from London, where he went into exile following the war. He was a widower for more than ten years.

On 14 August 1788, William married Mary Johnson d'Evelin, a wealthy Irish widow with children. William's son, Temple, after a failed business career in the U.S., lived with his father and stepmother for a time, and followed in his grandfather and father's footsteps and had an illegitimate daughter, Ellen (15 May 1798 London – 1875 Nice, France), with Ellen Johnson d'Evelin, the sister-in-law of his stepmother, Mary. William took responsibility for his granddaughter Ellen. Temple moved to Paris, where he lived the remainder of his life and never saw his father again. After Mary died in 1811, William continued to live with Ellen, age 13 at the time, and when he died in 1813 he left most of his small estate to her.

Colonial governor
William Franklin completed his law education in England, and was admitted to the bar. William and Benjamin Franklin became partners and confidants, working together to pursue land grants in what was then called the Northwest (now Midwest). Before they left England, the senior Franklin lobbied hard to procure his son an appointment, especially working with the Prime Minister Lord Bute.

Franklin was inducted into the original American Philosophical Society, founded by Benjamin Franklin, around 1758.

In 1763, William Franklin was appointed as the Royal Governor of New Jersey. He had asked the prime minister, Lord Bute for the position. Bute made the decision secretly to grant the request, not even informing Benjamin Franklin; he intended as a reward for Benjamin's role and a move to weaken the Penn faction. He replaced Josiah Hardy, a merchant and colonial administrator who sided with the New Jersey legislature against the government in London. Randall states:

American War of Independence

Owing to his father's role as a Founding Father and William's loyalty to Britain, the relationship between father and son became strained past the breaking point. When Benjamin decided to take up the Patriot cause, he tried to convince William to join him, but the son refused. After Benjamin Franklin was systematically ridiculed and humiliated by Solicitor-General Alexander Wedderburn before the Privy Council on 29 January 1774, he expected his son to resign in protest. Instead, William advised his father to take his medicine and retire from office. University of Mississippi historian Sheila Skemp noted: "[William] did not abandon Benjamin, but Benjamin abandoned him." His Loyalist position was a reflection of his respect for benevolent authority which he felt was embodied by the British Crown, a view consistent with his father's earlier Anglophilia. Further, unlike his father William was a devout member of the Church of England, which reinforced his loyalty to the Crown. Financially, he needed the salary and perquisites. On 13 January 1775, with revolution seeming imminent, Franklin delivered his "Two Roads" speech to the New Jersey legislature, urging the New Jersey Legislature to take the road toward prosperity as a part of England rather than a road to civil war and anarchy.  The legislature instead unanimously issued a resolution in support of the radicals in Boston.

Capture and imprisonment, 1776–1778
William Franklin remained as governor of New Jersey, and secretly reported Patriot activities to London. He continued as governor until January 1776, when colonial militiamen placed him under house arrest, which lasted until the middle of June. After the Declaration of Independence, Franklin was formally taken into custody by order of the Provincial Congress of New Jersey, an entity which he refused to recognize, regarding it as an "illegal assembly". He was incarcerated in Connecticut for two years, in Wallingford and Middletown. He surreptitiously engaged Americans in supporting the Loyalist cause. Discovered, he was held in solitary confinement at Litchfield, Connecticut for eight months. When finally released in a prisoner exchange in 1778, he moved to New York City, which was still occupied by the British.

New York Loyalist leader, 1778–1781
Once in New York, Boyd Schlenther says he became, "the acknowledged leader of the American loyalists, for whom he struggled to secure aid. He also built up an unofficial yet active spy network." He set up Loyalist military units to fight the Patriots, such as "Bacon's Refugees". In 1779, he had learned through his friend Jonathan Odell, and British Secret Service agent John André, that Benedict Arnold was secretly defecting to the British.

While in New York, Franklin tried to encourage a guerrilla war and active reprisals against the rebels but was frustrated by British Commander-in-Chief General Clinton, who did not support this nor had much use for American loyalists.  Nonetheless, Franklin coordinated a multi-colony group known as the Associated Loyalists that waged guerrilla warfare in New York, New Jersey and Connecticut.  A correspondence between Franklin's collaborator, British general William Tryon, and Lord George Germain led to Franklin receiving official blessing for the operation in 1780.

Asgill Affair

In 1782 Franklin was implicated in the Loyalist officer Richard Lippincott's hanging of Joshua Huddy. During a raid, Loyalist troops under Franklin's general oversight captured Joshua Huddy, an officer of the New Jersey militia. The Loyalist soldiers hanged Huddy in revenge for similar killings of Loyalists, particularly Phillip White. Huddy was a member of the Association of Retaliation, a vigilante body with a history of attacking and killing Loyalists and neutrals in New Jersey. At the time, some alleged that Franklin had sanctioned the killing of Huddy. This claim was theoretically substantiated by a note left on Huddy's body, which read, "Up goes Huddy for Philip White."

When he heard of Huddy's death, General George Washington threatened to execute Captain Charles Asgill, a British officer who had been captured at Yorktown, unless Lippincott were handed over to the American military. The British refused, but tried Lippincott. The British acquitted him of charges in the hanging. Due to the intervention of the French King Louis XVI, who interceded with his American allies to prevent Asgill's execution, the British officer was eventually released by the Continental Congress, where it was agreed he should return to England on parole. Despite the speed with which it was terminated, the Asgill Affair temporarily stalled peace talks between American and British authorities, extending uncertainty over the United States' prospects. Ironically, Benjamin Franklin was a senior negotiator for the revolutionary Americans in Paris when the Asgill Affair occurred.

Exile
The Surrender at Yorktown in October 1781 dimmed British hopes for victory, and in 1782, William Franklin departed for Britain, never to return. Once in London, he became a leading spokesman for the Loyalist community. Because of the continued strength of British forces in North America, in spite of the disaster at Yorktown, many expected Britain to continue fighting the war. The British naval victory against the French at the Battle of the Saintes and the successful defence of Gibraltar also raised their hopes. In summer 1782, a new British government came to power, who still hoped to achieve a reconciliation with the American colonies.

In 1783 he visited Scotland and was asked to be a founding member of the Royal Society of Edinburgh.

Benjamin Franklin dedicated his autobiography (written before the war) to his son, though the only mention of William within the manuscript is the inclusion of a newspaper article in which Franklin noted that his son was authorized to make contracts to purchase carts for the British army. But the father and son were never reconciled; the elder Franklin became known for his uncompromising position related to not providing compensation nor amnesty for the Loyalists who left the colonies, during the negotiations in Paris for the Peace of Paris. His son's reputation as a Loyalist contributed to his position. The British government gave him £1,800 from the Commissioners of Loyalist Claims. That was the value of his furniture; there was no payment for his lands. He also received a brigadier's half-pay pension of £800 per year.
 
William Franklin sent a letter to his father, dated 22 July 1784, in an attempt at reconciliation. His father never accepted his position, but responded in a letter dated 16 August 1784, in which he states "[We] will endeavor, as you propose mutually to forget what has happened relating to it, as well we can." William saw his father one last time in 1785, when Benjamin stopped in Britain on his return journey to the U.S. after his time in France. The meeting was brief and involved tying up outstanding legal matters. In a reconciliation attempt, Benjamin also proposed that his son give land that he owned in New York and New Jersey to William's son Temple, who had served as Benjamin's secretary during the war and for whom the elder Franklin had great affection, in order to repay a debt William owed his father; in the event, William transferred the New York portion of the land. In his 1788 will, Benjamin left William virtually none of his wealth, except some nearly worthless territory in Nova Scotia and some property already in William's possession. He said that had Britain won the war, he would have had no wealth to leave his son.

William died in 1813, and was buried in London's St Pancras Old Church churchyard. The grave is lost.

Legacy and honors
 Franklin Township in Bergen County, New Jersey, was named in William's honor, as was the borough of Franklin Lakes.

In popular culture
William Franklin is referenced in a humorous dialogue exchange in the stage musical 1776. During a session of the Continental Congress, John Hancock asks Benjamin Franklin if he has heard any news from his son, whom Hancock calls the Royal Governor of New Jersey. To this Dr. Franklin responds, "As that title might suggest, sir, we are not in touch at the present time." Later when a new congressional delegation from New Jersey arrives, the leader of the delegation, Rev. John Witherspoon, informs Dr. Franklin of William's arrest and transferral to Connecticut. Upon learning that William is unharmed, Dr. Franklin contemptuously answers, "Tell me, why did they arrest the little bastard?"

See also
 Burlington Company
 Proprietary House

Notes

References

Bibliography
 Epstein, Daniel Mark (2017). The Loyal Son: The War in Ben Franklin's House. Description & preview. Ballantine. Kirkus Review & Publishers Weekly Review
.
 Gerlach, Larry R. William Franklin: New Jersey's Last Royal Governor (1976), a scholarly biography
.
.
 Randall, Willard Sterne. "Franklin, William"; American National Biography Online 2000. 
.
 Schlenther, Boyd Stanley. "Franklin, William (1730/31–1813)", Oxford Dictionary of National Biography Oxford University Press, 2004; online edn, Jan 2008 Boyd Stanley accessed 1 Oct 2017 doi:10.1093/ref:odnb/62971 
 Skemp, Sheila L. "Benjamin Franklin, Patriot, and William Franklin, Loyalist." Pennsylvania History 65.1 (1998): 35–45.
 Skemp, Sheila L. "William Franklin: His Father's Son." Pennsylvania Magazine of History and Biography 109.2 (1985): 145–178.

Additional reading

External links

 The Proprietary House (final home of the Royal Governor)

1731 births
1813 deaths
Benjamin Franklin
British Army personnel of the War of the Austrian Succession
Burials at St Pancras Old Church
Colonial governors of New Jersey
Founder Fellows of the Royal Society of Edinburgh
Franklin family
Loyalists in the American Revolution from New Jersey
Politicians from Philadelphia
People of colonial New Jersey
People of colonial Pennsylvania
Royal American Regiment officers
Lawyers from Philadelphia
Loyalist military personnel of the American Revolutionary War